Damián Cerdá (born 26 April 1940) is a Spanish former sports shooter. He competed in the 25 metre pistol event at the 1972 Summer Olympics.

References

1940 births
Living people
Spanish male sport shooters
Olympic shooters of Spain
Shooters at the 1972 Summer Olympics
Place of birth missing (living people)